Chikwe Ihekweazu  is a Nigerian epidemiologist, public health physician and World Health Organization’s Assistant Director-General for Health Emergency Intelligence.

Ihekweazu previously served as Director General of Nigeria Centre for Disease Control (NCDC), the agency responsible for protecting public health and safety through the control and prevention of communicable diseases in Nigeria. He was appointed to head the agency in August 2016 by President Muhammadu Buhari.

Ihekweazu trained as an infectious disease epidemiologist and has worked in senior public health and leadership positions in several National Public Health Institutes, including The National Institute for Communicable Diseases South Africa (NICD), the UK's Health Protection Agency, and Germany's Robert Koch Institute (RKI). He has led several short-term engagements for World Health Organization WHO, mainly in response to major infectious disease outbreaks around the world. He was part of the WHO-China Joint Mission on Coronavirus disease 2019 (COVID-19)

Early life and education 
Ihekweazu was born to Nigerian-German parents. His parents met during protests of the Biafra war in South-Eastern Nigeria. His father was a Nigerian doctor and the mother, a German professor. His childhood was in the small university town of Nsukka where he obtained his foundational education; his secondary school education was obtained at the Federal Government College Enugu (FGCE) from 1983 to 1989.

Ihekweazu holds an MBBS from the University of Nigeria, Nsukka, a Diploma in Tropical Medicine at  University of Heidelberg, Germany, a Masters in Public Health from Heinrich Heine University Düsseldorf, Germany, a Fellowship of the European Programme for Intervention Epidemiology Training as well as a Fellowship of the UK's Faculty of Public Health.

Career 
From October 1997– January 1999 shortly after his graduation, Ihekweazu completed his Housemanship and served the mandatory one-year Nigerian National Youth Service Corps Scheme. During his service year, he provided direct clinical care and public health functions at the Abia State University Teaching Hospital Aba, Abia State, and Police College, Ikeja Lagos. Nigeria

In October 2001, Ihekweazu worked as a Medical Epidemiologist in the Robert Koch Institute (RKI), Berlin, a German Federal Government Agency and Research Institute responsible for disease control and prevention. During his time at RKI he was responsible for investigating outbreaks involving hospital-associated infections, and the analysis of surveillance data.

In February 2003, Ihekweazu became a Public Health Analyst at Haringey Primary Care trust, National Health Service, England. Chikwe managed routinely collected health intelligence data and the provision of health intelligence and analysis for a period of one year from February 2003 – January 2004. Upon leaving the National Health Service, he became a Research Fellow of the European Programme for Intervention Epidemiology (EPIET) in January 2004. There he was competitively selected to join the European Union-funded European Programme for Intervention Epidemiology Training (EPIET) which provided him with service-based specialist training and practical experience in intervention epidemiology. He applied his skills and experience in field epidemiology across a wide range of public health challenges, mostly during outbreaks of infectious diseases.

Following the completion of his fellowship program, Ihekweazu became Specialist Registrar in Public Health Medicine at the Health Protection Agency, England, where he spent two years. During his specialist-training programme in Public Health, he led several service-based projects in Public Health organisations in England and gained knowledge and experience in the control of infectious diseases, chemical, radiological and nuclear threats as well as in health project management and leadership.

Afterward, Ihekweazu became a consultant medical epidemiologist at United Kingdom's Health Protection Agency  in 2008.  The HPA's role was to provide an integrated approach to protecting public health in the UK by providing emergency services, support, and advice to the National Health Service (NHS). During his time there he managed the South East of England's Regional Epidemiology Unit (REU) including a team of 13 Public Health specialists. The REU provided outbreak investigation and management, surveillance, advice, and specialist support for the control of communicable diseases, as well as leading the response to environmental hazards in the South East Region of England, a population of about 10 million people.

In 2011, Ihekweazu moved to Johannesburg, South Africa to become the co-director of the Centre for Tuberculosis at the National Institute for Communicable Diseases, Johannesburg, South Africa with primary responsibility for the epidemiology section. During this period, he supported NICD to set up the first Provincial Epidemiology Service for the institute. His mandate included designing the service, recruiting the leadership provincial epidemiologists, initiating a supportive relationship in the nine provinces of South Africa, developing epidemiology capacity and surveillance for the institute. He also led the implementation of a nation-wide drug resistance survey for tuberculosis and the implementation of a new integrated surveillance system for tuberculosis in South Africa.

He co-founded EpiAfric, an African health consultancy group firm and Nigeria Health Watch as managing partner and editor respectively. From February 2014 – July 2016, he was the curator, Nigeria Health Watch (NHW). In January 2015 during the Ebola unrest he co-ordinated the WHO response in Montserrado County, this role included primarily supporting the Liberian Ministry of Health in their response and providing technical support and leadership to the response.

In February 2014, Ihekweazu became a part-time senior adviser at the National Institute for Communicable Diseases (NICD), Johannesburg, South Africa. He sits on the board of Society for Family Health.

Nigeria Centre for Disease Control 
Ihekweazu served as the first Director-General of the Nigeria Centre for Disease Control (NCDC). Following the signing of its Act by President Muhammadu Buhari, Nigeria Centre for Disease Control (NCDC) became an independent agency on 13 November 2018. As Director-General, Ihekweazu has led the agency through a period of redevelopment.  
He led the response to large outbreaks of infectious diseases, as well as a re-emergence of monkeypox and yellow fever in the country.

In recognition of the work done by NCDC under Ihekweazu's leadership, the Director-General of WHO, Tedros Adhanom Ghebreyesus visited the agency in 2018, and former Prime Minister of the UK, Tony Blair visited in 2019. From 2020, Ihekweazu served on the WHO's IHR Emergency Committee for COVID-19, chaired by Didier Houssin. He also leads Nigeria's public health response to the pandemic through NCDC. He served as a Member of the Africa Task Force for Coronavirus Steering Committee, where he chaired the Infection Prevention Control Sub-Committee, and Member of Nigeria's Presidential Task Force on COVID-19.

Health advocacy 
It was reported by Nature that Ihekweazu criticised Nigeria for being unprepared for epidemics. His critical piece attracted the attention of the former minister of health Babatunde Osotimehin, who suggested a meeting to put his views across to him. In his interview with The Guardian, when asked about fears of an outbreak as deadly as Ebola, plague or any other, he said "Through the recently developed national action plan for health security, we have developed a blueprint across the International Health Regulations work areas to ensure Nigeria is better prepared in the event of a pandemic". Between 2016 and 2018, as CEO of NCDC, Chikwe led several advocacy activities for the passage of the NCDC Bill. Although established in 2011, the NCDC existed without an Act for seven years. The Bill for an Act to establish NCDC was finally passed by the National Assembly and signed into law by President Muhammadu Buhari in November 2018.

Other activities
 Epidemiology and Infection, Member of the Editorial Board
 Journal of Public Health in Africa, Member of the Editorial Board
 One Campaign, Member of the Africa Policy Advisory Board

Personal life
Ihekweazu is married to Vivianne Ihekweazu and they have two children.

Publications

References 

Living people
Nigerian epidemiologists
Nigerian public health doctors
University of Nigeria alumni
Nigerian chief executives
Year of birth missing (living people)